Hokkaidoconchidae, common name hokkaidoconchids, is an extinct family of deep-water sea snails, marine gastropod mollusks.

Shell description 
The shell is small and elongate.

Genera 
 Hokkaidoconcha Kaim, Jenkins & Warén, 2008 - type genus
 Hokkaidoconcha tanabei Kaim, Jenkins & Warén, 2008 - the type species from the upper Cretaceous in Japan
 Hokkaidoconcha bilirata Kiel, Campbell, Elder & Little, 2008 - from the lower Cretaceous in Wilbur Springs, California, USA
 Hokkaidoconcha morenoensis Kiel, Campbell, Elder & Little, 2008 - from the upper Cretaceous in Moreno Gulch, California, USA
 Hokkaidoconcha occidentalis (Stanton, 1895) - synonym Hypsipleura? occidentalis Stanton, 1895 - from the upper Jurassic to the lower Cretaceous in California: Paskenta, California, Berryessa, San Jose, California, Wilbur Springs, California
 Hokkaidoconcha tehamaensis Kiel, Campbell, Elder & Little, 2008 - from the upper Jurassic in Paskenta, California, USA

References